In time series analysis, the lag operator (L) or backshift operator (B) operates on an element of a time series to produce the previous element.  For example, given some time series

then

 for all 

or similarly in terms of the backshift operator B:  for all . Equivalently, this definition can be represented as

 for all 

The lag operator (as well as backshift operator) can be raised to arbitrary integer powers so that

and

Lag polynomials
Polynomials of the lag operator can be used, and this is a common notation for ARMA (autoregressive moving average) models. For example,

specifies an AR(p) model.

A polynomial of lag operators is called a lag polynomial so that, for example, the ARMA model can be concisely specified as

where  and  respectively represent the lag polynomials

and

Polynomials of lag operators follow similar rules of multiplication and division as do numbers and polynomials of variables. For example,

means the same thing as

As with polynomials of variables, a polynomial in the lag operator can be divided by another one using polynomial long division. In general dividing one such polynomial by another, when each has a finite order (highest exponent), results in an infinite-order polynomial.

An annihilator operator, denoted , removes the entries of the polynomial with negative power (future values).

Note that   denotes the sum of coefficients:

Difference operator

In time series analysis, the first difference operator  :

Similarly, the second difference operator works as follows:

The above approach generalises to the i-th difference operator

Conditional expectation
It is common in stochastic processes to care about the expected value of a variable given a previous information set. Let  be all information that is common knowledge at time t (this is often subscripted below the expectation operator); then the expected value of the realisation of X, j time-steps in the future, can be written equivalently as:

With these time-dependent conditional expectations, there is the need to distinguish between the backshift operator (B) that only adjusts the date of the forecasted variable and the Lag operator (L) that adjusts equally the date of the forecasted variable and the information set:

See also
 Autoregressive model
 Autoregressive moving average model
 Moving average model
 Shift operator
 Z-transform

References

Time series